The 2010 South Alabama Jaguars football team represented the University of South Alabama in the 2010 NCAA Division I FCS football season. They were led by second-year head coach Joey Jones and played their home games at Ladd–Peebles Stadium.

Continuing the Jaguars' slow immersion into Division I football, the Jaguars increased their schedule to ten games (up from seven in their inaugural season), dropped all of their prep school opponents and played three of their ten contests on the road. The Jaguars completed their second season with an undefeated record of ten wins and zero losses (10–0).

Schedule

References

South Alabama
South Alabama Jaguars football seasons
College football undefeated seasons
South Alabama Jaguars football